Nižepole is a village in the municipality of Bitola, North Macedonia and is an alpine settlement 7.85 kilometers from Bitola.

History 
The population of Nižepole was made up of older inhabitants of Aromanians (Vlachs) and later Arvanito-Vlachs who formed a large part of the village population. A small number of Muslim Albanians over time settled in Nižepole originating from the Korçë region. During the first World War, Nižepole fell on the Allied side of the Macedonian front and its Aromanian villagers first fled to Florina and then most went to Katerini, Greece. After the war, most Nižepole Aromanians preferred to remain in Katerini after a few returnees came back telling of the destruction of the village. Only in 1923 with the Population exchange between Greece and Turkey and arrival of Greek refugees after the Greco-Turkish War (1919–1922) did some Nižepole inhabitants return to the village.

Demographics

In statistics gathered by Vasil Kanchov in 1900, the village of Nižepole was inhabited by 1590 Aromanians, 250 Orthodox Albanians and 190 Orthodox Bulgarians. According to the statistics of Geographers Dimitri Mishev and D. M. Brancoff, the town had a total Christian population of 940 in 1905, consisting of 780 Vlachs and 160 Patriarchist Bulgarians.

According to the 2002 census, the village had a total of 186 inhabitants. Ethnic groups in the village include:

Vlachs 105
Macedonians 47
Albanians 30
Romani 4

People from Nižepole 

 Theodoros Adam, Greek chieftain of the Macedonian Struggle

References

External links

Villages in Bitola Municipality
Aromanian settlements in North Macedonia
Albanian communities in North Macedonia